Dresselberg is an extinct, Danish medieval noble family.

History
The family lived on Zealand. Its first known member was Henrik Jensen in Lyngby who is mentioned in 1470. The last member of the family was Vilhelm Dresselberg who died in 1620.

Insignia
Their shield featured a green oak branch with two yellow acorns on blue background. Their helmet featured eight alternating blue and green peacock feathers.

Property
The family is for instance associated with Dragsholm and Vindingegaard.

Notable members
 Vilhelm Dresselberg (1545-1620)

References

External links
 Family tree

 
Danish noble families
Medieval Danish nobility